Romy's Salon is a 2019 Dutch drama film directed by Mischa Kamp. It was based on the book of the same name by Tamara Bos.  In July 2019, it was shortlisted as one of the nine films in contention to be the Dutch entry for the Academy Award for Best International Feature Film at the 92nd Academy Awards, but it was not selected.

In 2020, director Mischa Kamp won the Golden Calf for Best Director award at the Netherlands Film Festival. Beppie Melissen won the Golden Calf for Best Actress award for her role in the film and Noortje Herlaar won the Golden Calf for Best Supporting Actress for her role in the film. Tamara Bos won the Golden Calf for Best Script award.

Cast 
 Vita Heijmen as Romy
 Beppie Melissen as Stine Rasmussen
  as Margot
  as Willem

References

External links 
 

2019 drama films
2019 films
2010s Danish-language films
Dutch drama films
2010s Dutch-language films
2010s German-language films
2019 multilingual films
Dutch multilingual films